"서울의 빛" A.K.A. "The Lights of Seoul" by BoA is a special promo Korean single CD which was a special single given to people who attended Hi Seoul festival in 2003. The single was released five days later on her Atlantis Princess album which was released on May 30, 2003.

CD design
The CD is a Gate-fold style cardboard sleeve. Lyrics are on inner-sleeve.

Trivia
This CD sold at 280usd~340usd on yahoo Japan auction.
Only 20000 copies were made for promotion.

Track listing
 The Lights of Seoul (Korean Version) 4:26
 The Lights of Seoul (English Version) 4:25

See also 
 The Lights of Seoul (Seoul Metropolitan Government)

2003 singles
BoA songs
2003 songs
SM Entertainment singles